A condominium or "condo" is a form of housing tenure and other real property where a specified part of a piece of real estate (usually of an apartment house) is individually owned. Use of land access to common facilities in the piece such as hallways, heating system, elevators, and exterior areas are executed under legal rights associated with the individual ownership. These rights are controlled by the association of owners that jointly represent ownership of the whole piece.

The United States Census Bureau indexes information about condominiums and cooperative apartments, among other types of households, at its Survey of Market Absorption of Apartments. As of October 2015, this compilation includes 95 metropolitan areas of the United States. Some condominium buildings in the United States have been listed on the U.S. National Register of Historic Places. In some cities in the United States, such as Lakewood, Ohio, city governments have attempted to invoke eminent domain upon residents to take over their property and enable private developers to build condominiums. This may be done in an effort to generate more revenue by increasing property tax bases.

A housing cooperative, or co-op, is a legal entity, usually a corporation, which owns real estate, consisting of one or more residential buildings; it is one type of housing tenure. Housing cooperatives are a distinctive form of home ownership that have many characteristics that differ from other residential arrangements such as single family home ownership, condominiums and renting.

Residential condominiums in the United States

 1010 Midtown, a 35-story skyscraper in Atlanta, Georgia with 425 condominiums atop 38,000  of retail and dining space.
 110 East Washington Street, a high rise in Indianapolis, Indiana. Was originally built in 1921–1922 as the main office for National City Bank.
 1100 Wilshire, residential skyscraper completed in 1987 in Los Angeles, California
 1280 West, a 38-story l skyscraper in Atlanta, Georgia with 434 units
 1706 Rittenhouse, a private residence in Rittenhouse Square, Philadelphia, Pennsylvania. It is known for being an expensive residential building, with many units costing over $3.9 million
 2727 Kirby, a 30-story, 96 unit, condominium high rise, designed by Ziegler Coope and located in Upper Kirby just south of Westheimer in Houston, Texas
 2828 Peachtree
 3344 Peachtree
 360 Condominiums
 99 West on South Temple
 Ambassador Apartments – located in Portland, Oregon, it was added to the U.S. National Register of Historic Places in 1979
 The Austonian
 Baskerville Apartment Building – located in Madison, Wisconsin; added to the National Register of Historic Places in 1988
 Brooks Tower
 Buckhead Grand
 The Carlyle – Pittsburgh
 CenterCourt
 The Century – Los Angeles
 The Century Towers
 The Condominiums at North Bank Park
 Continental Building
 Cornwall Apartments – listed on the National Register of Historic Places in 1976, it is located in the Capitol Hill section of Denver, Colorado
 Cray Plaza
 D.T. Porter Building
 Eastern Columbia Building
 Endeavour (building)—Located near the Johnson Space Center, Endeavour Condominiums are on Clear Lake waterfront in Houston's Bay Area. Designed by EDI International, this 30-story tower is a community of 80 residences.
 Everett Station Lofts
 Galaxy Towers
 GLG Grand
 Grand Avenue Project
 Grande Condominiums
 Graystone Manor
 Hamilton Watch Complex
 Harbor Towers
 HarborView Condominium
 Healey Building
 Hotel Kimball
 Hunter's Key – Tampa, Florida
 Key Colony – condominium
 Mandarin Oriental, Atlanta
 Metropolis Condominium, a 21-story twin-tower condominium in Atlanta, Georgia with 498 condominiums atop 40,000 sq ft of retail and dining space.
 The Mercer West Tower
 Oceanwide Center
 One Lincoln Park – Denver, Colorado
 One Thousand Ocean
 Palms Place
 The Paramount at Buckhead
 Park Avenue Condominiums
 Park Building – Cleveland, Ohio
 Park Place – Atlanta, Georgia
 Park Plaza Condominiums
 Park Towers – Sandy Springs, Georgia
 Paseo Colorado
 Pennsbury Village – Pennsylvania
 The Regent – City Creek, Salt Lake City, Utah
 The Residences at The Ritz-Carlton – Philadelphia, Pennsylvania
 Richard Court
 Sampson Altadena Condominiums
 Sierra Towers
 Signature Place
 Silo Point
 Society Hill Towers
 Spire – Atlanta, Georgia
 The Spires – Houston, Texas
 Streamline Tower
 Textile Center Building – a 12-story Gothic Revival and Italian Renaissance Revival architectural styled brick building located in the Los Angeles Fashion District; listed on the National Register of Historic Places in 2005
 Thai Xuan Village
 Three PNC Plaza
 Towers at Harbor Court
 Trump Towers – Sunny Isles Beach, Florida
 TWELVE Midtown
 Union Station – Pittsburgh, Pennsylvania
 University Club Tower – Milwaukee, Wisconsin
 ViewPoint
 Village Green – Los Angeles, California
 The Watermark Detroit
 Waterplace
 Wilshire Regent
 Woodlands – Lexington, Kentucky

By location

Residential condominiums in Miami, Florida

 50 Biscayne – a 57-story skyscraper condominium with architecture based on the Miami Modern style; has many design features that pay tribute to landscape architect Roberto Burle Marx's emphasis on natural aesthetics seen along the bay
 500 Brickell – residential complex in the Brickell neighborhood
 900 Biscayne Bay –  skyscraper; northeastern Downtown
 Atlantis Condominium
 Capital at Brickell –  a proposed complex of two skyscrapers in the Brickell neighborhood
 EPIC Miami Residences and Hotel – a condo-hotel being constructed by Lionstone Hotels and Resorts
 Four Seasons Hotel Miami – contains a Toronto-based Four Seasons Hotel property, office space and several residential condominium units
 Met 1 – residential skyscraper located in the Metropolitan Miami complex
 Met 3 – part of Metropolitan Miami, a complex of four skyscrapers in the central business district
 Metropolis at Dadeland – a pair of skyscraper condos in the Dadeland neighborhood
 Metropolitan Miami – mixed-use development consisting of three completed skyscrapers, a fourth uncompleted building, and a lifestyle center
 One Fifty One at Biscayne – residential property in North Miami; consists of 373 condominiums
 Panorama Tower – mixed-use skyscraper under construction in the Brickell neighborhood
 Paramount Bay at Edgewater Square – a high-rise condominium building in the Edgewater Neighborhood
 Riverfront – complex containing three main towers: "Mint" and "The Ivy" and "Wind"
 Ten Museum Park – residential skyscraper
 Toscano – group of residential condos in the Dadeland neighborhood
 Villa Magna Condominiums – urban development that was planned to rise in Brickell; the housing crisis of the late 2000s halted the project

Residential condominiums in Chicago, Illinois

 108 North State Street, a 21-story residential condominium tower in an urban center located in the Loop community area of downtown Chicago, Illinois
 1700 East 56th Street – apartment building; underwent a condominium conversion in 1994
 235 Van Buren, A 46 story skyscraper designed by Perkins & Will and built by CMK Companies located in Chicago's Loop neighborhood
 340 on the Park
 401 East Ontario
 55 East Erie Street
 680 N Lake Shore Drive
 900 North Michigan
 Aqua
 Brewster Apartments
 The Buckingham
 Chicago Place
 Chicago Spire
 Elysées Condominiums
 The Fordham
 Fulton House
 Grand Plaza I
 The Grant
 Hampton House
 Harbor Point
 The Heritage at Millennium Park
 Joffrey Tower
 John Hancock Center
 Lake Point Tower
 Legacy Tower
 Mandarin Oriental
 Manhattan Building
 Marina City
 Metropolitan Tower
 Mid-Continental Plaza
 The Montgomery
 Montgomery Ward Company Complex
 North Harbor Tower
 North Pier Apartments
 Old Chicago Main Post Office Twin Towers
 Olympia Centre
 One Magnificent Mile
 One Museum Park
 Outer Drive East
 Palmolive Building
 Park Place Tower
 Park Tower
 Park Tower Condominium
 The Parkshore
 The Pinnacle
 Plaza 440
 Plaza on DeWitt
 River East Center
 River Plaza
 Skybridge
 Trump International Hotel and Tower
 Waldorf Astoria Chicago
 Waldorf-Astoria Hotel and Residence Tower
 Water Tower Place
 Wolf Point South Tower

Condominiums and housing cooperatives in New York

 Trump Tower – a 35-story condominium located in the city of White Plains in Westchester County

Residential condominiums in New York City

 1 Lincoln Plaza
 20 Exchange Place
 30 Park Place
 50 West Street
 56 Leonard Street
 88 Greenwich Street
 161 West 93rd Street
 252 East 57th Street
 432 Park Avenue
 459 West 18th Street
 731 Lexington Avenue
 The Apthorp
 Belaire Apartments
 Carnegie Hill Tower
 Cassa Hotel 45th Street New York
 Chelsea Modern
 Cleburne Building
 The Continental NYC
 Downtown Athletic Club
 Gilsey House
 New York Cancer Hospital
 One Riverside Park
 One57
 Riverside South, Manhattan
 Silver Towers
 Time Warner Center
 Trump Palace Condominiums
 Trump SoHo
 Trump Tower
 Trump World Tower
 W New York Downtown Hotel and Residences
 Williamsburgh Savings Bank Tower

Condominiums and housing cooperatives in the Bronx
 Amalgamated Housing Cooperative
 Co-op City
 Parkchester

Condominiums and housing cooperatives in Brooklyn

 47 Plaza Street West
 Amalgamated Warbasse Houses
 Lindsay Park – housing cooperative
 On Prospect Park
 Seabreeze Plaza Condominium located at 3111 Ocean Parkway

Condominiums and housing cooperatives in Manhattan

 1049 5th Avenue
 15 Central Park West
 173 and 176 Perry Street
 2 Horatio Street
 257 Central Park West
 299 West 12th Street
 302 West 12th Street
 353 Central Park West
 36 East 72nd Street
 370 Riverside Drive
 408 Greenwich Street
 432 Park Avenue
 459 West 18th Street
 45 Christopher Street
 520 West 28th
 55 Central Park West
 59 West 12th Street
 620 Park Avenue
 625 Park Avenue
 655 Park Avenue
 740 Park Avenue
 810 Fifth Avenue
 834 Fifth Avenue
 880 Fifth Avenue
 907 Fifth Avenue
 927 Fifth Avenue
 930 Fifth Avenue
 970 Park Avenue
 998 Fifth Avenue
 The Ansonia
 The Apthorp
 The Ariel
 Astor Court Building
 Atelier
 Barbizon Hotel
 The Beresford
 C-Squat
 Casa 74
 Castle Village
 The Century – Central Park West, Manhattan
 The Colosseum – Manhattan
 Confucius Plaza
 Cooperative Village
 The Cornwall
 The Dakota
 The Dorilton
 Dunbar Apartments
 The El Dorado
 Hotel Chelsea
 Housing Conservation Coordinators
 Hudson View Gardens
 The Level Club
 Lincoln Towers
 Madison Green
 The Majestic
 MiMA
 Morningside Gardens
 The Normandy
 One Madison
 Osborne Apartments
 Palazzo Chupi
 Park Cinq
 Penn South
 The Prasada
 Pythian Temple
 River House
 The San Remo
 Southbridge Towers
 Trump International Hotel and Tower
 Tudor City

Condominiums and housing cooperatives in Queens
 Breezy Point – cooperative in which all residents pay the maintenance, security, and community-oriented costs involved with keeping the community private; the cooperative owns the entire 500-acre (2 km2) community; residents own their homes and hold shares in the cooperative, less urbanized than most of the rest of New York City
 Forest Hills Co-op Houses – cooperative houses are located on an 8.5-acre (34,000 m2) site at 108–03 62nd Drive on the border of the Queens neighborhoods of Forest Hills and Corona
 North Shore Towers – three-building residential cooperative located in the Floral Park neighborhood, near the city's border with Nassau County
 Rochdale Village – housing complex and neighborhood in the southeastern corner of Queens; located in Community Board 12; grouped as part of Greater Jamaica, corresponding to the former Town of Jamaica
 Roxbury – inholding within the borders of the Breezy Point Unit of Gateway National Recreation Area, of the US National Park System

Residential condominiums in San Francisco, California

 181 Fremont Street
 340 Fremont Street
 399 Fremont Street
 Four Seasons Hotel
 Jasper
 Millennium Tower
 The Montgomery
 One Rincon Hill
 The Paramount

Residential condominiums in Washington, D.C.

 1010 Mass
 The Cairo
 Carolina On The Hill
 CityCenterDC
 Columbia Hospital for Women
 Miller House
 Washington Harbour
 Waterfront Tower

See also

 List of New York City housing cooperatives
 List of condo hotels in the United States
 List of condominiums in Canada

References

condominiums
condominiums